El Chorro is a resort (balneario) in the Maldonado Department of southeastern Uruguay.

Geography
The resort is located on the coast of the Atlantic Ocean, on Route 10,  just east of its junction with Route 104. It borders the resort Manantiales to the west and the resort Balneario Buenos Aires to the east.

Population
In 2011 El Chorro had a population of 392 permanent inhabitants and 540 dwellings.
 
Source: Instituto Nacional de Estadística de Uruguay

References

External links
INE map of El Tesoro, La Barra, Laguna Blanca, Manantiales and El Chorro

Populated places in the Maldonado Department
Seaside resorts in Uruguay